Mercer County, Virginia has existed twice in the U.S. state of Virginia's history. Formed in 1785, and 1837, respectively, both counties were named for Revolutionary War General Hugh Mercer, who was killed at the Battle of Princeton in 1777, and each was separated from Virginia due to the creation of a new state, partitioned in accordance with Article IV, Section 3, Clause 1 of the United States Constitution. The two counties continued in existence as:
 Mercer County, Kentucky, separated when Kentucky was admitted to the Union in 1792.
 Mercer County, West Virginia, separated when West Virginia was admitted to the Union in 1863.

See also
 Former counties, cities, and towns of Virginia

Pre-statehood history of Kentucky
Pre-statehood history of West Virginia
Former counties of Virginia
1785 establishments in Virginia
1837 establishments in Virginia